State Ladies or Statsdame at the Russian Imperia Court were the second largest group of court ladies, after Ladies in Waiting or Maids of Honour. This position was officially established during the reign of Paul I, at the coronation of his wide Catherine I. Before that women simply carried portraits of the Empress. As a general rule of thumb, most of the ladies of state were also cavalry ladies, women awarded with the Order of Saint Catherine, given to them for their philanthropy or charity at court. When appointed to the position, the women were bestowed with a portrait of the Empress with a crown set in diamonds, similar to the maid of honour cipher.

In 1870 and 1871, the Russkaya Starina magazine published an extensive list of State Ladies, compiled by Pavel Fedorovich Karabanov.

State Ladies of Empress Catherine  (until 1725)

State Ladies of Empress Catherine I (1725-1727)

State Ladies of Empress Anna I (1741-1761)

State Ladies of Empress Elizabeth I

State Ladies of Empress Catherine II

State Ladies of Empress Maria Feodorovna (Sophie Dorothea of Württemberg) (1796-1801)

State Ladies of Empress Elizabeth Alexeievna (1801-1825)

State Ladies of Empress Alexandra Feodorovna (Charlotte of Prussia)

State Ladies of Emoress Maria Alexandrovna

State Ladies of Maria Feodorovna (Dagmar of Denmark) (1881-1894)

State Ladies of Empress Alexandra Feodorovna (Alix of Hesse) (1894-1917)

Reference section

Literature 

 Address-calendar. The general list of commanding and other officials in all departments of the Russian Empire. St. Petersburg, 1831-1916
 The court of Russian emperors in its past and present // Comp. N. E. Volkov. In 4 parts. - St. Petersburg, 1900. - S. 208-230.
 P. F. Karabanov. Ladies of state and ladies-in-waiting of the Russian court in the 18th century // Russian antiquity. - 1870. - Volume 2. - S. 468-498.
 P. F. Karabanov. Ladies of state and ladies-in-waiting of the Russian court in the 18th century // Russian antiquity. - 1871. - Volume 3. - S. 39-48; 272-282; 457-460.
 Commemorative book for 1869. - St. Petersburg: Court Printing House. - S. 279.
 Court calendar. St. Petersburg, 1879-1889, 1895, 1897, 1903, 1911, 1915, 1916

Russia history-related lists